Perry Victor Moss (born November 11, 1958) is an American former National Basketball Association (NBA) basketball player.

Moss played basketball at Northeastern University under coach Jim Calhoun, where he averaged 15.2 points per game and 3.7 rebounds per game in four seasons there. In his senior season, Moss was named the America East Conference Men's Basketball Player of the Year. Moss graduated as the school’s second-leading career scorer with 1722 points and a 15.2 average in 113 games. He was considered the most explosive guard in New England and one of the most athletic players in the nation. In 1982 he went head to head with future NBA All-Star Dominique Wilkins and the Georgia Bulldogs in the first round of the Gotten State Classic. Despite a big game from Moss, the Huskies lost, but Lakers GM Jerry West, who was in the audience, noted that Moss was the best guard he had seen that year. On his home court, Moss would dazzle the fans with his acrobatic dunks created by his 41-inch vertical leap. As a junior in 1981, Moss teamed with guard Pete Harris to lead the Huskies to their first of seven conference titles. His career included a number of clutch shots, including Moss's halfcourt bomb that sent the championship game versus Holy Cross into overtime, which NU eventually won 76–69. He also hit a last second shot in the opening round of the NCAA tournament when NU knocked off 20th ranked Fresno State before bowing out to Utah. Moss and the Huskies repeated the feat a year later, as Moss averaged 23.7 points per game. NU defeated St. Joseph's 63–62 in the first round, before dropping a heartwrenching, triple overtime affair to Villanova in the second round. Moss scored 23 and 31 points respectively, in those two games. For his career, Moss scored over 30 points eight times and made seven straight all tournament squads.

Moss was then drafted with the twenty-third pick in the third round of the 1982 NBA draft by the Boston Celtics, but he was released before playing a single game. Prior to the 1983-84 NBA season Moss was signed by the New Jersey Nets, but was once again released before playing a single game. He played three years in the Continental Basketball Association (CBA) before making his NBA debut for the Washington Bullets in the 1985-86 NBA season.  He was released mid-season. Moss finished the 1985–86 season by playing for the Philadelphia 76ers. After the season, Moss was once again released, but he did play for the Golden State Warriors in the 1986-87 NBA season. On Sep 27, 1989, he was signed by the Orlando Magic, but was waived before the start of the regular season. In total, he played in 136 NBA games, and averaged 3.9 points and 1.5 assists.

Moss spent the next decade playing with a string of CBA teams, including the La Crosse Catbirds and the Topeka Sizzlers (1988–1989), Rockford Lightning (1991–1992), Yakima Sun Kings (1993–1994), Hartford HellCats (Player/Coach 1994–1995), and the Connecticut Pride (Player/Coach 1995–1996).

In all he played on ten CBA teams in eleven years, and finished his CBA career in 1995 playing for the Connecticut Pride team that also featured future UConn coach Kevin Ollie in his rookie season.

Despite sustaining injuries, including a broken ankle that sidelined him for the 1990–1991 season, Moss's emphasis on high-level fitness and healthy eating gave him remarkable longevity. At the age of 39, he finished his final professional basketball season in 1997 playing for the Norwich Neptunes of the Atlantic Basketball Association.

On May 22, 2013, it was announced that Moss would be inducted into the New England Basketball Hall of Fame as part of its Class of 2013.

References

1958 births
Living people
American men's basketball players
Basketball players from Tucson, Arizona
Bay State Bombardiers players
Boston Celtics draft picks
Columbus Horizon players
Golden State Warriors players
Maine Lumberjacks players
Northeastern Huskies men's basketball players
Philadelphia 76ers players
Point guards
Rockford Lightning players
Tampa Bay Thrillers players
Topeka Sizzlers players
Washington Bullets players
Wichita Falls Texans players
Yakima Sun Kings players
American expatriate basketball people in the Philippines
Magnolia Hotshots players
Philippine Basketball Association imports
Amherst Regional High School (Massachusetts) alumni